LSAT may refer to:

 Law School Admission Test, a standardized test that is part of the law school admission process
 Lightweight Small Arms Technologies, a U.S. weapon program
 LSAT (oxide),  (lanthanum strontium aluminium tantalum oxide), a ceramic crystal  with the perovskite structure
 LSAT light machine gun
 LSAT caseless ammunition
 LSAT rifle